The 1989 Tulane Green Wave football team was an American football team that represented Tulane University during the 1989 NCAA Division I-A football season as an independent. In their second year under head coach Greg Davis, the team compiled a 4–8 record.

Schedule

References

Tulane
Tulane Green Wave football seasons
Tulane Green Wave football